Hagei (Hakei) or Green Gelao (sometimes translated as Blue Gelao) is a Gelao language spoken in China and Vietnam.

Dialects
The primary dialectal areas where Hagei (Green Gelao) is still spoken are:
Guizhou: in Guanling County, Qinglong County, and Zhenfeng County
Guangxi: in Sanchong 三冲 village, Longlin County
Vietnam: in Hà Giang Province

The Hagei varieties of northern Guizhou, such as in Zunyi, are extinct.

References

Kra languages
Languages of China
Languages of Vietnam